Edward H. Ives (December 18, 1819November 18, 1892) was an American lawyer, Democratic politician, and pioneer of Iowa and Wisconsin.  He was a member of the Wisconsin State Senate and State Assembly, representing Pierce County, and earlier was sheriff of Des Moines County, Iowa.

Biography
Ives was born on December 18, 1819, in Newton Falls, Ohio.  He was elected sheriff of Des Moines County, Iowa, in 1850.  He moved to Prescott, Wisconsin, in 1858.

In Pierce County, he was the publisher of the Prescott Plaindealer, a Democratic partisan newspaper.

Ives was a member of the Democratic Party and was elected to the Wisconsin State Assembly in 1868, representing all of Pierce County.  The following year he was elected to the Wisconsin State Senate, representing Wisconsin's 28th State Senate district, which then comprised eight counties in the northwest of the state.

He died at his home in Prescott on November 18, 1892.

Personal life and family
Edward Ives was the second of nine children born to Eben Ives and his wife Elizabeth ( Hull).  His grandfather, Asa Ives, fought in the American Revolutionary War.  The Ives were descendants of William Ives, who came to the Massachusetts Bay Colony from England in 1635.

Edward Ives married Mary J. Harris.  They had four children.  Their eldest son, John, also became a lawyer and public official—he was district attorney of Barron County, Wisconsin, and later served in the Minnesota House of Representatives and the Minnesota Senate.

References

1819 births
1892 deaths
People from Newton Falls, Ohio
People from Des Moines County, Iowa
People from Prescott, Wisconsin
Iowa sheriffs
Democratic Party Wisconsin state senators
Democratic Party members of the Wisconsin State Assembly
19th-century American politicians